Waldemar Erfurth (4 August 1879 – 2 May 1971) was a German general of infantry, writer, and liaison officer to Finland during World War II

Erfurth was born in Berlin. He had served in World War I, winning the Iron Cross 1st Class and the Knight's Cross of the Royal House Order of Hohenzollern. After the War he continued service in the Reichswehr of the Weimar Republic. During the Second World War he was a liaison officer in the Finnish headquarters 1941–44. He wrote a book about the Murmansk railroad and a war journal from 1944. He died in Tübingen.

Awards and decorations
 Iron Cross of 1914, 1st and 2nd class
 Knight's Cross of the Royal House Order of Hohenzollern with Swords (7 November 1916)
 Prussian Service Cross Award
 Bavarian Military Merit Order, 3rd class with Swords
 Knight's Cross, First Class of the Order of Albrecht with Swords
 Military Merit Cross, 2nd class (Mecklenburg-Schwerin)
 War Merit Cross, 2nd class (Brunswick)
 Hanseatic Cross of Lubeck
 Order of the Iron Crown, 3rd class with war decoration (Austria)
 Austrian Military Merit Cross, 3rd class with war decoration
 Ottoman War Medal (Turkish: Harp Madalyası; "Gallipoli Star", or "Iron Crescent")
 Order of Bravery 4th Class, 1st stage (Bulgaria)
 Finnish Order of the Cross of Liberty, First Class with Breast Star and Swords (16 September 1941) [5] 
 Knight's Cross of the War Merit Cross with Swords (8 November 1944)

Bibliography 
 Der finnische Krieg (1950)
 Die Geschichte des deutschen Generalstabs von 1918 bis 1945 (1957)

References

1879 births
1971 deaths
Military personnel from Berlin
People from the Province of Brandenburg
German Army generals of World War II
Generals of Infantry (Wehrmacht)
Prussian Army personnel
German Army personnel of World War I
Lieutenant generals of the Reichswehr
German prisoners of war in World War II held by the United States
Recipients of the Hanseatic Cross (Lübeck)
Recipients of the Order of the Cross of Liberty, 1st Class with a Star
Recipients of the Order of Bravery, 4th class
Recipients of the Knights Cross of the War Merit Cross